Diane Wray Williams (born January 23, 1938) was an American businesswoman, educator, and politician.

Williams was born in Fremont, Ohio. She graduated from Syracuse University, in 1959, with a bachelor's degree in English. Williams lived in Moorhead, Minnesota with her husband and family. She was a business owner and a teacher. Williams served in the Minnesota House of Representatives in 1989 and 1990 and was a Democrat. She then served on the Moorhead City Council in 2004.

References

1938 births
Living people
People from Fremont, Ohio
People from Moorhead, Minnesota
Syracuse University alumni
Businesspeople from Minnesota
Schoolteachers from Minnesota
Women city councillors in Minnesota
Women state legislators in Minnesota
Democratic Party members of the Minnesota House of Representatives